The women's singles squash event at the 2019 Pan American Games will be held from July 25th – July 27th at the CAR Voleibol en la Videna in Lima, Peru.

Format
Each National Olympic Committee could enter a maximum of two athletes into the competition. The athletes will be drawn into an elimination stage draw. Once an athlete lost a match, they will be no longer able to compete. Each match will be contested as the best of five games.

Results

Bracket

References

External links
Results

Women's singles